NEC Corporation of America (NECAM) is the principal subsidiary of the multinational IT company NEC in the United States.

NEC Corporation of America was formed on July 1, 2006, from the combined operations of NEC America, NEC Solutions (America) and NEC USA.

History

NEC America Inc.
NEC America Inc, originally known as Nippon Electric New York, was incorporated in 1963.

NEC Home Electronics (USA), Inc.
NEC Home Electronics (USA), Inc. was established in October 1981.

HNSX Supercomputers
In October 1986, NEC formed a joint venture with Honeywell, HNSX Supercomputers, to sell NEC's supercomputers in the United States and Canada. In October 1989, Honeywell agreed to sell its share in HNSX Supercomputers to NEC.

NEC Research Institute
NEC established its US research lab, NEC Research Institute in South Brunswick, Princeton, New Jersey in 1988.

NEC Technologies, Inc.
In November 1989, NEC announced that it would merge NEC Home Electronics (USA) with NEC Information Systems, Inc. to form NEC Technologies, Inc.

NEC Laboratories America
NEC Laboratories America was created in November 2002 through the merger of NEC Research Institute and NEC USA's Computer and Communications Research Laboratory. NEC Laboratories succeeded in sending over 100 terabits of information per second through a single optical fibre in April 2011, establishing a new world record.

NEC Solutions (America), Inc.
On April 1, 2002, NEC announced that NEC Technologies, Inc. would be merged with NEC Computers Inc. and NEC Systems, Inc. to form NEC Solutions (America), Inc.

NEC Corporation of America
NEC Corporation of America was formed on July 1, 2006, from the combined operations of NEC America, NEC Solutions (America) and NEC USA.

Operations
Subsidiaries of NEC Corporation of America include:

NEC Laboratories America - a research facility based in Princeton, NJ focused on technology research and early market validation.
NEC Financial Services, LLC. - a company which offers financing services supporting the sale of products to businesses in the United States.

Products and services
NEC Corporation of America's products and services include:

automated fingerprint identification systems
carrier professional services
document solutions equipment
enterprise communications equipment
enterprise content management
openflow networking equipment
identity management
leasing and financial services
microwave radio equipment
optical networking equipment
Business Intelligence, Corporate Performance Management
 Data warehousing, Master Data Management
 Predictive Analytic services, Big Data 
retail applications
servers
software
storage equipment

Controversies
In April 1997 HNSX Supercomputers and Fujitsu were jointly found guilty of dumping by bidding below cost in order to sell a supercomputer to the National Center for Atmospheric Research. In September 1997 the United States International Trade Commission found that Cray Research had been financially injured by the pricing practices of HNSX Supercomputers and Fujitsu.

See also
Mitsubishi Electric United States

References

External links
NEC Corporation of America
NEC Laboratories America (NEC Labs)

Computer companies established in 2006
Computer companies of the United States
NEC subsidiaries
American subsidiaries of foreign companies
American companies established in 2006
Companies based in Irving, Texas
2006 establishments in Texas